Headingley is a ward in the metropolitan borough of the City of Leeds, West Yorkshire, England.  It contains 111 listed buildings that are recorded in the National Heritage List for England.  Of these, two are listed at Grade II*, the middle of the three grades, and the others are at Grade II, the lowest grade.  The ward is to the northwest of the centre of Leeds, and is largely residential.  As Leeds became more prosperous in the 19th century, the area developed to become "the prime residential area of Leeds".  Most of the listed buildings are houses and associated structures, many of the houses are large, and some were used later for other purposes.  The other listed buildings include churches and associated structures, public houses, remaining structures from the Leeds Zoological and Botanical Gardens, a cinema and lamp post, a war memorial, and a group of telephone kiosks.

Note: the area known as Far Headingley is in the Weetwood ward.


Key

Buildings

References

Citations

Sources

 

Lists of listed buildings in West Yorkshire
Listed